Super Lap is a time attack motorsport event. Super Lap events are being held in Australia and New Zealand.

Australia
The inaugural Superlap Australia event was held at the Oran Park Raceway in July 2008. It has since become an annual event attracting the fastest circuit cars in the country and even some overseas guests.

In Australia, Super Lap is divided into three classes: Club Sprint Class, Open Class and an invitational Pro Class
The requirements for each class are described on the Superlap Australia  website.

New Zealand
In New Zealand,  the first NZ Performance Car Super Lap was held in April 2007 at Taupo Motorsport Park. It was the first event of its kind held in New Zealand on a race circuit. Other time trial-style events have been road-based run by motoring clubs, such as rallying and bent sprints.

Super Lap is an event specially formulated as a total test of import street car performance, and is only open to JDM (Japanese domestic market) import cars.  Originating in Japan—where such events are often called Tuner Battles because of competition between "tuning houses"—the style of racing has been adopted in the UK, US, and Australia.

In its New Zealand format, Super Lap is broken down into individual classes: Street Pro (PRO), Street Private (PVT) and Unlimited class (ULM).
Street Pro consists of caged warranted, registered and certified cars. Street Private consists of uncaged, street-legal cars. The Unlimited class (introduced for Super Lap 2008 at Taupo Motorsport Park) allows full competition cars—those not road-registered but race-ready—to compete. Unlimited class cars are not eligible to win Super Lap.

Competitors are timed over a single flying lap of the track in a qualifying format. Competitors start from the pit lane on its out-lap. When the car crosses the start-finish line for the first time, the timer is started. The timer is stopped when the start-finish line is crossed at the end of the flying lap, and the competitor performs and in-lap, returning to the pits. The fastest ten go into a top-10 shootout in the same format. The winner of this wins the event.

In 2016 the format slightly changed and the use of a full slick tyre was banned from use in the New Zealand superlap series and will continue forward using a d.o.t semi slick tyre like the z221s by Hankook or the A050 by Yokohama for e.g. this would now align New Zealand with the rest of the world in the time attack / super lap format and continue to grow alongside the rest of the globe.

Typical cars
Readily available high-performance Japanese imports are used such as:
Nissan Skyline GT-R,
Nissan Silvia,
Nissan Pulsar GTI-R,
Nissan 300ZX,
Nissan 350Z,
Nissan Laurel,
Subaru WRX,
Subaru Legacy,
Mitsubishi Lancer Evolution,
Honda Integra,
Honda Civic,
Honda S2000,
Toyota Celica,
Toyota Supra,
Toyota Levin AE86,
Toyota Altezza,
Mazda RX-7,
Mazda 323,
Mazda RX-8.

Results

Superlap Australia 2009 Oran Park, GP Circuit
For a full list of results go to 

See all the lap times and full listing at Natsoft

2008 Taupo (1 November)
This results table shows the fastest overall times of the day. Barry Manon, in third place, was the first non-Unlimited class car, and therefore claimed the Super Lap title for Taupo 2008. Defending champion Scott Kreyl retired with mechanical difficulties.

2008 Pukekohe (6 April)
Scott Kreyl in his Mitsubishi Lancer Evolution VIII retained his Super Lap title.

2007 Taupo

References

External links
 Super Lap Australia
 Super Lap
 Super Lap Legends
 Parkside Media
 NZ Performance Car magazine

Motorsport in New Zealand